Pecan Summer is an opera written and composed by the Indigenous Australian singer Deborah Cheetham, who also sang in every season. It was orchestrated by Jessica Wells. It is the first opera written by an Indigenous Australian and involving an Indigenous cast. It is based on the February 1939 Cummeragunja walk-off, in which Cheetham's grandparents were involved.

Pecan Summer was commissioned for the Olympic Arts Festival held in association with the 2012 Summer Olympics in London.

The libretto was written by Deborah Cheetham during a short stay in Lucca, Italy. The opera had its official world premiere at the WestSide Performing Arts Centre, Mooroopna, Victoria, on 8 October 2010, where it was presented by the Short Black Opera Company and the Melbourne Chamber Orchestra under David Kram. It had an unofficial preview performance in Melbourne in July 2010.

With his agreement, Cheetham used a recording of then Prime Minister Kevin Rudd's February 2008 parliamentary apology to the "Stolen Generations" as part of the work.

The timeline of the opera moves from the Dreamtime to July 2006, on the banks of the Yarra River near Federation Square in Melbourne; to 1939, on the banks of the Dhungala (Murray River) near the Cummeragunja Mission; to several months later in winter 1939; to Shepparton at an unspecified time; to Federation Square on 13 February 2008, the day of Kevin Rudd's apology.

The world premiere performance was broadcast by ABC Classic FM on 28 November 2010. Short Black Opera company has produced four seasons of Pecan Summer: Mooroopna 2010; Melbourne 2011; Perth 2012; Adelaide 2014; Sydney 2016. The 2016 season was performed in the Concert Hall of the Sydney Opera House and was recorded by National Indigenous Television and ABC Classic FM.

References

External links
 Pecan Summer at Deborah Cheetham's website
 Pecan Summer rehearsal at Art Nation, ABC

Operas
Operas set in Australia
2010 operas
English-language operas
Operas set in the 20th century
Operas set in the 21st century
Operas by Deborah Cheetham